Jacques-Marie Cramezel de Kerhué   was a French Navy officer. He took part in the exploration voyages of Bougainville, fought in the War of American Independence, and took part in the British-backed Royalist insurgency against the Republic during the French Revolution.

Biography 
Kerhué joined the Navy as a Garde-Marine on 19 August 1757. He was promoted to Lieutenant on 14 February 1778, and to Major de vaisseau on 1 May 1786. 

He took part in the Siege of Louisbourg in 1758. In 1765, he was appointed to the 20-gun corvette Étourdie for a cruise at Saint Pierre Island. He took part in the exploration voyage of Bougainville.

In 1778, he was first officer on the 32-gun frigate Fortunée, part of the fleet under Admiral d'Orvilliers.

At the French Revolution, he became an émigré, and took part in the Invasion of France in 1795. He was killed in June.

Sources and references 
 Notes

References

 Bibliography
 
 
 
 

French Navy officers